Hilary Anne Clark (born 1955) is a Canadian poet.

Life
Graduated from Simon Fraser University (BA Hons English), University of Toronto (MA Comparative Literature), and University of British Columbia (PhD Comparative Literature).

Taught English at the University of Saskatchewan from 1990 to 2015.

Awards
 1999 Saskatchewan Book Award for Poetry
 1999 Pat Lowther Award
 2006 co-winner, bpNichol Chapbook Award

Works

Poetry

Non-fiction

Hilary Clark (2011). The Fictional Encyclopedia. Routledge reprints. 1990. ISBN 978-0-4156-6833-0.

References

1955 births
Living people
20th-century Canadian poets
21st-century Canadian poets
Canadian women poets
Simon Fraser University alumni
University of Toronto alumni
University of British Columbia alumni
Academic staff of the University of Saskatchewan
20th-century Canadian women writers
21st-century Canadian women writers